Davide Mattei (born 17 March 2001), known by his stage name tha Supreme or Thasup, is an Italian rapper, singer and producer from Fiumicino.

Career 
His first mainstream success was thanks to the single "Perdonami" by the Italian rapper Salmo, which he produced. Following the success of "Perdonami", Tha Supreme continued releasing songs of his own and producing for other artists such as Marracash, Gemitaiz and Madman, Izi as well as his sister, Mara Sattei. His debut album 23 6451 (stylized for LE BASI, italian for "The basics") was released on 15 November 2019, collecting over 13 million streams in 24 hours.

He also featured on two Italian number-one singles: "Yoshi" with Machete and "Supreme – L'ego" by Marracash and Sfera Ebbasta.

On 30 September 2022, tha Supreme released its second studio album c@ra++ere s?ec!@le ("Carattere speciale"), which was preceded by the singles m%n ("Moon"), released on 22 October 2021, s!r! ("Siri"), released on 15 July 2022, and okk@pp@ ("Okkappa"), released on 23 September 2022. The album consists of 20 tracks and 11 features (with Coez, Mara Sattei, Tiziano Ferro, Shiva, Rkomi, Tananai, the Pinguini Tattici Nucleari, Lazza, Sfera Ebbasta, Salmo and Rondodasosa).

Controversy 
On 7 December 2021, Tha Supreme stated on his Instagram account that, in his opinion, the singer Blanco had copied from his music and never credited or mentioned Tha Supreme for it, pretending he did not know anything about it when asked in interviews. The Instagram post was deleted after several days.

Discography

Albums

Singles

As lead artist

As featured artist

References

Italian rappers
2001 births
Living people
People from Fiumicino